Ryan Kavanagh (born February 12, 1991) is a Canadian former ice hockey defenceman.

Career
Kavanagh played junior hockey in the Quebec Major Junior Hockey League for the Rimouski Océanic and the Shawinigan Cataractes between 2008 and 2011. He began his professional career in 2011 in the Erste Bank Eishockey Liga in Austria for EC Red Bull Salzburg and then moved to Germany's Deutsche Eishockey Liga to play for EHC München. He returned to North America in 2013 and signed for the Reading Royals of the ECHL but the tenure only lasted 19 games before moving to the Tønsberg Vikings in Norway's GET-ligaen in the tail-end of their season. In 2014, Kavanagh moved the United Kingdom's Elite Ice Hockey League and signed for Glasgow-based team the Braehead Clan. In 2016, he moved to Italy and signed for HC Pustertal Wölfe before retiring.

Career statistics

Regular season and playoffs

International

Awards and honours

References

External links

1991 births
Anglophone Quebec people
Braehead Clan players
Canadian ice hockey defencemen
EC Red Bull Salzburg players
EHC München players
Living people
Reading Royals players
Rimouski Océanic players
Shawinigan Cataractes players
Ice hockey people from Montreal
Tønsberg Vikings players
Canadian expatriate ice hockey players in Italy
Canadian expatriate ice hockey players in Scotland
Canadian expatriate ice hockey players in Austria
Canadian expatriate ice hockey players in Norway
Canadian expatriate ice hockey players in Germany
Canadian expatriate ice hockey players in the United States